Dibenzazepine (iminostilbene) is a chemical compound with two benzene rings fused to an azepine group. Many pharmaceuticals, such as carbamazepine, oxcarbazepine, and depramine, are based on a dibenzazepine structure.

See also 
 Benzazepine
 Dibenzothiazepine
 Dibenzothiepin
 Dibenzoxepin

References

External links 
 

 
Tricyclic antidepressants
Aromatic amines